The following highways are numbered 197:

Canada
  Quebec Route 197

Japan
 Japan National Route 197

United States
 U.S. Route 197
 Alabama State Route 197
 Arkansas Highway 197
 California State Route 197
 Connecticut Route 197
 Florida State Road 197 (former)
 Georgia State Route 197
Hawaii Route 197
 K-197 (Kansas highway)
Kentucky Route 197
 Maine State Route 197
 Maryland Route 197
 Massachusetts Route 197
 Minnesota State Highway 197
 New Mexico State Road 197
 New York State Route 197
 North Carolina Highway 197
 Ohio State Route 197
 Tennessee State Route 197
 Texas State Highway 197 (former)
 Texas State Highway Loop 197 (former)
 Texas State Highway Spur 197
 Farm to Market Road 197 (Texas)
 Utah State Route 197
 Virginia State Route 197
 Wyoming Highway 197